Hillery L. Brown (July 30, 1912 – February 8, 1991) was an American professional basketball player. Brown played for one season in the National Basketball League for the Chicago Studebaker Flyers, averaging 4.1 points per game.

References

1912 births
1991 deaths
American men's basketball players
Basketball players from Chicago
Basketball players from Jackson, Mississippi
Chicago Studebaker Flyers players
Forwards (basketball)
Guards (basketball)